J28 may refer to:
 J/28, an American sailboat
 County Route J28 (California)
 de Havilland J 28 Vampire, a British jet fighter in service with the Swedish Air Force
 Jacks, Twos, and Eights, a card game
 Pennsylvania Railroad class J28, an American steam locomotive
 Square orthobicupola, a Johnson solid (J28)